George Cuthbertson may refer to:
 George Adrian Cuthbertson (1898–1969), Canadian marine painter
 George Harding Cuthbertson (1929–2017), Canadian yacht designer, founder of C&C Yachts